The  was Japan's first jet aircraft. It was developed late in World War II and the first prototype had only flown once before the end of the conflict. It was also called .

Design and development
After the Japanese military attaché in Germany witnessed trials of the Messerschmitt Me 262 in 1942, the Imperial Japanese Navy issued a request to Nakajima to develop a similar aircraft to be used as a fast attack bomber. Among the specifications for the design were the requirements that it should be able to be built largely by unskilled labor, and that the wings should be foldable. This latter feature was to enable the aircraft to be hidden in caves and tunnels around Japan as the navy began to prepare for the defense of the home islands. Nakajima designers Kazuo Ohno and Kenichi Matsumura laid out an aircraft that bore a strong but superficial resemblance to the Me 262.

The Kikka  was designed in preliminary form to use the Tsu-11, a rudimentary motorjet style jet engine that was essentially a ducted fan with an afterburner. Subsequent designs were planned around the Ne-10 (TR-10) centrifugal-flow turbojet, and the Ne-12, which added a four-stage axial compressor to the front of the Ne-10. Tests of this powerplant soon revealed that it would not produce anywhere near the power required to propel the aircraft, and the project was temporarily stalled. It was then decided to produce a new axial flow turbojet based on the German BMW 003.

Development of the engine was troubled, based on little more than photographs and a single cut-away drawing of the BMW 003, a suitable unit, the Ishikawajima Ne-20, was finally built in 1945. By mid-1945, the Kikka project was making progress once again and at this stage, due to the deteriorating war situation, it is possible that the Navy considered employing the Kikka as a kamikaze weapon, although this prospect was questionable due to the high cost and complexity associated with manufacturing contemporary turbojet engines. Other more economical projects designed specifically for kamikaze attacks, such as the simpler Nakajima Tōka (designed to absorb Japanese stock of obsolete engines), the pulsejet-powered Kawanishi Baika, and the better-known Yokosuka Ohka, were either underway or already in mass production.

Compared to the Me 262, the Kikka airframe was noticeably smaller and more conventional in design, with straight wings (lacking the slight sweepback of the Me 262) and tail surfaces. The triangular fuselage cross section characteristic of the German design was less pronounced, due to smaller fuel tanks. The main landing gear of the Kikka was taken from the A6M Zero and the nose wheel from the tail of a Yokosuka P1Y bomber.

Designation
The Kikka is often identified as the Nakajima J9N1, or occasionally J9Y, which according to a researcher at the National Air and Space Museum is incorrect. The official name given to the aircraft was 橘花 "Kikka." Like other Japanese aircraft intended for use in suicide missions, it received only a name. Imperial Japanese Naval aircraft were designated similar to U.S. Naval aircraft of the time frame. A first letter, denoting the role/type of aircraft, separated by a number that denotes where in the series of aircraft of the same role the aircraft resides, followed by a second letter denoting the design and manufacturing firm, and finally, a second number denoting the aircraft subtype. The first three characters remain constant through all the sub-variants an aircraft might be built to.

Operational history

The first prototype commenced ground tests at the Nakajima factory on 30 June 1945. The following month it was dismantled and delivered to Kisarazu Naval Airfield where it was re-assembled and prepared for flight testing. The first flight took place on 7 August 1945 (the day after Hiroshima was bombed by atomic bomb), with Lieutenant Commander Susumu Takaoka at the controls. The aircraft performed well during a 20-minute test flight, with the only concern being the length of the takeoff run. For the second test flight, four days later (4 days prior to Japan's declaration of surrender), rocket assisted take off (RATO) units were fitted to the aircraft. The pilot had been uneasy about the angle at which the rocket tubes had been set, but with no time to correct them they decided to simply reduce the thrust of the rockets from 800 kg to only 400 kg. Four seconds into take off the RATO was actuated, immediately jolting the aircraft back onto its tail leaving the pilot with no effective tail control. After the nine-second burning time of the RATO ran out the nose came down and the nose wheel contacted the runway, resulting in a sudden deceleration, however both engines were still functioning normally. At this point the pilot opted to abort the take off, but fighting to brake the aircraft and perform a ground loop only put him in danger of running it into other installations. Eventually the aircraft ran over a drainage ditch which caught the tricycle landing gear, the aircraft continued to skid forward and stopped short of the water's edge. Before it could be repaired Japan had surrendered and the war was over.

At this point, the second prototype was close to completion, and approximately 23 more airframes were under construction. One of these was a two-seat trainer. Other follow-on versions proposed had included a reconnaissance aircraft, and a fighter armed with two 30 mm Type 5 cannons with 50 rounds per gun. These were expected to be powered by more advanced developments of the Ne-20, known as Ne-20-Kai  5.59 kN (570 kgf) or Ne-130 8.826 kN (900 kgf) or Ne-230 8.679 kN (885 kgf) or Ne-330 13.043 kN (1330 kgf), which were planned to have approximately 15% to 140% better thrust than the Ne-20.

Postwar

After the war, airframes 3, 4, and 5 (and possibly other partial airframes) were brought to the U.S. for study. Today, two examples survive in the National Air and Space Museum: The first is a Kikka that was taken to the Patuxent River Naval Air Base, Maryland for analysis. This aircraft is very incomplete and is believed to have been patched together from a variety of semi-completed airframes.  It is seen in the black and white photo in bare metal with two Ne-20 engines mounted under the wings.  It is currently still in storage at the Paul E. Garber Preservation, Restoration and Storage Facility in Silver Hill, Maryland.  The second Kikka is on display at the NASM Udvar-Hazy Center in the Mary Baker Engen Restoration Hangar. Correspondence in 2001 with Japanese propulsion specialist Kazuhiko Ishizawa theorized that Nakajima constructed the Museum’s Kikka airframe for load testing, not for flight tests. This may explain why the engine nacelles on the Museum’s Kikka airframe are too small to enclose the Ne-20 engines.

Two Ne-20 jet engines had been taken to the US and sent for analysis to the Chrysler Corporation in 1946. This was only revealed in 2005 by W. I. Chapman, who was in charge of the project at the time. A working engine was assembled with the parts of the two Ne-20s, and tested for 11 hours and 46 minutes. A report was issued on 7 April 1947, titled "Japanese NE-20 turbo jet engine. Construction and performance". The document is now on display at the Tokyo National Science Museum.

Variants
Nakajima Aircraft Company developed some variants of the aircraft:

There was also a modified version of the design to be launched from a 200 m long catapult, the 
"Nakajima Kikka-kai Prototype Turbojet Special Attacker". This differed in having a projected total weight of 4,080 kg and a maximum speed of 687 km/h at 6,000 m.

Operators

Imperial Japanese Navy (Planned)

Specifications (Kikka)

See also

References

Notes

Bibliography

 Famous Aircraft of the World no.76: Japanese Army Experimental Fighters (1). Tokyo: Bunrin-Do, August 1976.
 Francillon, René J. Japanese Aircraft of the Pacific War. London: Putnam & Company Ltd., 1995, First edition 1970. .
 The International Encyclopedia of Aircraft. Toronto, Ontario, Canada: B. Mitchell, 1991. .
 Ishizawa, Kazuhiko. KIKKA: The Technological Verification of the First Japanese Jet Engine Ne 20. Tokyo: Miki Press, 2006. .
 Mikesh, Robert C. Kikka, Monogram  Close-Up 19. Bolyston, Massachusetts: Monogram Aviation Publications, 1979. .
 Yamashita, Takeo, ed.「秋水」と日本陸海軍ジェット、ロケット機. Tokyo: Model Art Co. Ltd., 1998.
 別冊航空情報編集部. 航空秘話復刻版シリーズ (2): 知られざる軍用機開発(下). Tokyo: Kantosha, 1999. .
 歴史群像編集部. [歴史群像] 太平洋戦史シリーズ Vol.56: 大戦末期 航空決戦兵器, 橘花、火龍、秋水、キ74......幻のつばさ(2). Tokyo: Gakken, 2006. .

External links

 The Nakajima Kikka entry at the Hikoki: 1946 website
 Smithsonian NASM page on their Nakajima Kikka
 Nakajima Kikka – Minijets.org

1940s Japanese attack aircraft
Kikka, Nakajima
1940s Japanese experimental aircraft
Kikka
World War II jet aircraft of Japan
Twinjets
Aircraft first flown in 1945